Daphne Theresa Chia (born ) is a former Singaporean rhythmic gymnast. She represented Singapore at international competitions from 2013 to 2015.

Early life and education 
Chia was born on 26 September 1996 in Indianapolis, United States. She attended Raffles Girls' School, and then Raffles Institution in Singapore. , Chia is a medical student at University of Cambridge.

She renounced her US citizenship in 2018.

Career 
Chia started training as a rhythmic gymnast at the age of nine. In 2009, Chia represented her secondary school in the national Rhythmic Gymnastics Championships. She started representing Singapore in international competitions since 2010, starting with the ASEAN School Games 2010 in which her rhythmic gymnast team was placed second. In 2013, Chia represented Singapore in Asian Rhythmic Gymnastics Championships and World Rhythmic Gymnastics Championships. In 2014, Chia represented Singapore in 2014 Commonwealth Games – women's rhythmic team all-around gymnastics and was placed eighth. In 2015, Chia represented Singapore in 2015 Southeast Asian Games – women's rhythmic individual all-around gymnastics event and was placed sixth. She had retired from the sport thereafter and chose to further her studies at University of Cambridge.

References

1996 births
Living people
Singaporean rhythmic gymnasts
Gymnasts at the 2014 Commonwealth Games
People who renounced United States citizenship